Agona Clan is one of the eight major Akan clans.

Totem
The totem of the Agona people is the parrot hence their linguistic prowess.

Major towns
The Denkyirahene is from the Agona clan.

References

Ghanaian culture
Akan people